"(I Don't Want to Be) Second Best" is a song from New Zealand singer Margaret Urlich. The song was released in March 1993 as the third single from her second studio album, Chameleon Dreams. The song peaked at number 39 in New Zealand.

Track listing
CD single/7" (Columbia 659003.1)
 "(I Don't Want to Be) Second Best"	
 "Escaping" (live version; recorded in December 1992)
 "(I Don't Want to Be) Second Best" (extended version)

Charts

References

External links
 "(I Don't Want to Be) Second Best" at Discogs

1992 songs
1993 singles
Margaret Urlich songs
Columbia Records singles
Songs written by Margaret Urlich
Songs written by Tony Swain (musician)